Fath (cannon) is a 40 mm naval artillery weapon used by the Ministry of Defence and Armed Forces Logistics (Iran). It is an unlicensed copy of the Swedish Bofors 40mm L/70 autocannon

References 

Artillery of Iran
Naval anti-aircraft guns
Autocannon